Susie Blake (born 19 April 1950) is an English television, radio and stage actress.

She is best known for her portrayal of the snobbish TV announcer in Victoria Wood: As Seen on TV and Bev Unwin in Coronation Street, which she played between 2003 and 2006, before a brief return in 2015. She has also played Hillary Nicholson in Mrs. Brown's Boys since 2011.

Personal life
Blake was born in Highgate, London to David and Molly Blake. Her mother was an illustrator and children's television presenter. She is the granddaughter of actress Annette Mills, and a great-niece of actor Sir John Mills. Actresses Hayley and Juliet Mills are Blake's first cousins once-removed.

Blake trained at the Arts Educational School and the London Academy of Music and Dramatic Art.

Acting
Blake regularly appeared in Victoria Wood's television programmes and has extensive radio credits. She appeared in the first episode of the sitcom One Foot in the Grave in which her character was responsible for firing Victor Meldrew, thus setting the events of the show in motion. She appeared as Bev Unwin in the ITV soap opera Coronation Street until her departure in December 2006.

Blake played the character of Madame Morrible in the West End production of Wicked, replacing Miriam Margolyes on 2 April 2007. Her final performance was on 12 April 2008 before she was succeeded by Harriet Thorpe. Blake appeared as a witch in the pantomime Wizard of Oz at The Lowry Theatre and Gallery, Salford, in 2004/2005.

In late 2008 to early 2009, she starred in the national UK tour of Boeing Boeing, and appeared as Judith in an episode of the third series of Wild at Heart. She was also in a national tour of Grumpy Old Women 2 in 2009 with Jenny Eclair and Wendi Peters.

Blake appeared as Hilary Nicholson in the RTÉ and BBC comedy Mrs. Brown's Boys, replacing Sorcha Cusack, who played Hilary in the first series. In 2015, she played The Queen in a theatre tour of the West End hit Handbagged.

Blake briefly reprised her Coronation Street role of Bev Unwin in July 2015 to help the long-running character Deirdre Barlow (played by Anne Kirkbride, who had recently died) bow out of the soap in January 2015.

In March 2019, Blake portrayed Agatha Christie's Miss Marple in a theatre production of The Mirror Crack'd at the Salisbury Playhouse.
Also appeared in The Darling Buds Of May.

Television
 Rooms, as Sarah (1974)
 Zodiac, as Peggy (1974)
 Armchair Thriller: A Dog's Ransom, as Marion Dowell (1978)
 Cribb, as Lotte (1979)
 Russ Abbot Madhouse (1981–1985)
 Victoria Wood: As Seen on TV (1985–1987)
 Something for the Weekend (1989)
 One Foot in the Grave, as Victor Meldrew's boss (1990)
 Darling Buds of May, as Mrs. Jerebohm (1991)
 The Wail of the Banshee, as Faye Morgan (1992)
 Mud, as Miss Dudderidge (1994–1995)
 Sooty's Amazing Adventures, as all the females (apart from Katarina) (1997–1998)
 A Prince Among Men, as Beverly (1997–1998)
 Roger Roger, as Eve (1999)
 The Quiet Garden, as Mother (2002)
 Coronation Street, as Bev Unwin (2003–2006, 2015; 373 episodes)
 Kelly & Lewis, as Carol Taylour (2007–2009)
 Wild at Heart, as Judith (2008)
 Murder Most Foul, as Elizabeth Bailey (2008–2009, 2013)
 Mrs. Brown's Boys, as Hilary Nicholson (2011–2013, 2015, 2017–present)
 Parents, as Alma Miller (2012)
 Great Night Out, as Mrs. B (2013)
 You, Me & Them, as Emma Grey (2013–2015)
 Cuckoo, as Belinda (2016)
 Murder on the Blackpool Express, as Marjorie (2017)
 Casualty, as Belle Radnor (2019)
 The Real Marigold Hotel, as herself (2020)
Not Going Out, as Carol (2021)
Kate & Koji, as Joyce (2022)

Radio
 The Phenomenon Squad (1987)
 Barrymore Plus Four (1995)
 Auntie's Secret Box (1996)

Theatre
 The Mirror Crack'd at the Salisbury Playhouse (2019)

References

External links
 

1950 births
Living people
English television actresses
English radio actresses
English stage actresses
English musical theatre actresses
People educated at the Arts Educational Schools
Alumni of the London Academy of Music and Dramatic Art
20th-century English actresses
21st-century English actresses
Actresses from London
People from Highgate